Alípio Duarte Brandão (born 7 June 1992), known simply as Alípio, is a Brazilian footballer who plays for Figueirense  as an attacking midfielder.

Early years
Born in Brasília, Distrito Federal, Alípio left Brazil at the age of 14. An orphan, he moved to Portugal with his legal guardian Helber Damião, co-owner of the football school Dois Toques.

His first footballing rights were split between Damião, his original club in his homeland, Sport Club Internacional, and the team to where he moved, Rio Ave FC.

Club career
In November 2008, Alípio joined Real Madrid for roughly €1.4 million, without having made one single first-team appearance with Rio Ave. He scored two goals on his debut for the C-team which operated in Tercera División, and played his second game against CF Rayo Majadahonda in a 2–0 home win, as they eventually finished in eighth position; he played most of his first two years, however, with the Juvenil side.

After scoring in a training match against the Real Madrid first team on 11 February 2009, Alípio made his official debut for Real Madrid Castilla four days later, against Águilas CF, as an 87th-minute substitute for Miguel Palanca. Thus, he became the youngest player ever to appear for the reserves; during the ten minutes he played, he impressed spectators and his coaches alike with his ball skills.

In the 2010–11 season, aged 18, Alípio returned to Portugal, being sold to S.L. Benfica and signing a five-year contract with the Primeira Liga club. In his first year in Lisbon he played for the under-19s but, late into it, was loaned to Série C team América Futebol Clube (RN).

Alípio returned to Benfica shortly after due to bureaucratic problems and was again loaned, now to Al-Sharjah SCC in the UAE Arabian Gulf League. After two years away from professional football he went on trial with AC Omonia, who later signed him to a permanent deal; he made his debut for his new club on 23 October, against Nikos & Sokratis Erimis for the campaign's Cypriot Cup. Three days later he first appeared in the First Division, coming from the bench to provide two assists in the 6–0 away routing of Doxa Katokopias FC.

Personal life
Alípio idolized Ronaldo while he was growing up. His compatriot also played professionally for Real Madrid, winning the 2002 FIFA World Cup with Brazil.

References

External links

 
 
 

1992 births
Living people
Brazilian footballers
Association football midfielders
Segunda División B players
Tercera División players
Real Madrid C footballers
Real Madrid Castilla footballers
S.L. Benfica footballers
Campeonato Brasileiro Série A players
Campeonato Brasileiro Série B players
Figueirense FC players
América Futebol Clube (RN) players
Luverdense Esporte Clube players
Esporte Clube Vitória players
Atlético Clube Goianiense players
Vila Nova Futebol Clube players
Fortaleza Esporte Clube players
Sharjah FC players
Cypriot First Division players
AC Omonia players
Football League (Greece) players
Apollon Smyrnis F.C. players
Brazilian expatriate footballers
Expatriate footballers in Portugal
Expatriate footballers in Spain
Expatriate footballers in the United Arab Emirates
Expatriate footballers in Cyprus
Expatriate footballers in Greece
Brazilian expatriate sportspeople in Portugal
Brazilian expatriate sportspeople in Spain
Brazilian expatriate sportspeople in Cyprus
Brazilian expatriate sportspeople in Greece
Footballers from Brasília